George De Witt Wright (December 22, 1958) is an American former professional baseball player. He played five seasons in Major League Baseball (MLB) from 1982–86 for the Texas Rangers and Montreal Expos, primarily as a center fielder.

Career
In 1983, Wright had a career year with a surprising Texas Rangers club that was in first place at the all-star break. For the season he played in all 162 games and hit .287 with 18 home runs, 80 rbi, and a .745 OPS. The next several seasons he was often injured and failed to live up to his 1983 performance. In his last game with the Rangers he committed a costly three-base error in the bottom of the 9th inning of a game in which Charlie Hough would later lose a no-hitter and the game.

Wright later played briefly for the Montreal Expos and eventually had two seasons in Japan for the Hawks, in 1988 when they were the Nankai Hawks, and in 1993 when they were the Daiei Hawks. He also spent several seasons in the Mexican League, from 1990–92 and 1994-97.

References

External links

1958 births
Living people
African-American baseball players
American expatriate baseball players in Canada
American expatriate baseball players in Japan
American expatriate baseball players in Mexico
Asheville Tourists players
Baseball players from Oklahoma
Fukuoka Daiei Hawks players
Gulf Coast Rangers players
Indianapolis Indians players
Jacksonville Expos players
Langosteros de Quintana Roo players
Leones de Yucatán players
Major League Baseball outfielders
Memphis Chicks players
Montreal Expos players
Nankai Hawks players
Nippon Professional Baseball outfielders
Oklahoma City 89ers players
Phoenix Firebirds players
Rieleros de Aguascalientes players
Saraperos de Saltillo players
Sportspeople from Oklahoma City
Texas Rangers players
Tulsa Drillers players
Vancouver Canadians players
21st-century African-American people
20th-century African-American sportspeople